Frakull e Madhe is a village in the former municipality of Frakull in Fier County, Albania. At the 2015 local government reform it became part of the municipality Fier.

Notable people
Nezim Frakulla 18th century Albanian poet.

References

Populated places in Fier
Villages in Fier County